The 15 Khordad Foundation is one of the organizations created in Iran in 1982 on orders of Ruhollah Khomeini that intend to fix the economic issues of the families of martyrs, veterans, and founders of the Iranian Revolution. This foundation is one of the Revolutionary Institutions of the Islamic Republic of Iran and is under the supervision of the Office of the Supreme Leader.

The 15 Khordad Foundation in reality was a supplementary office to the Foundation of Martyrs and Veterans Affairs. The scope of its activities included: the creation of the 15 Khordad Cultural and Literary Association, the collection of documents regarding the 1963 demonstrations in Iran, organizing commemoration ceremonies, construction of the 15 Khordad Dam near Qom, and regulating the supply of drinking water in Qom, and many more.

The foundation is one of the organizations under the supervision of the Supreme Leader. After its creation, the foundation was under the supervision of a council appointed by Khomeini, of which one of the members was Habibollah Asgaroladi.

The foundation offered a $2.8m bounty for the murder of Salman Rushdie. Later, it increased its amount to $3.3m.  In October 2022, The U.S. Department of the Treasury's Office of Foreign Assets Control imposed sanctions on 15 Khordad Foundation over this matter.

Establishment 
15 Khordad Foundation is an institution that was established on the 15th of Khordad 1360 by the order of the founder of the Islamic Republic of Iran, Seyyed Ruhollah Khomeini. And the purpose of its creation is to solve the economic problems of the families of the killed people (knowns as "martyrs") of Iran's Islamic Revolution and the war and the deprived.

Actions 
Among the actions of the 15 Khordad Foundation, activities such as:

Support for terminally ill and cancer patients
Activity in the field of childbearing and population increase
Compiling the books, like publishing the book "Fifteen Khordad, Sixty Years Later" (with the participation of National Library and Documents Organization)
And so on.

See also
Office of the Supreme Leader
1963 demonstrations in Iran
Foundation for the Preservation and Publication of Sacred Defense Works and Values
 Execution of Imam Khomeini's Order
 Barakat Foundation

References

Government agencies of Iran
Foundations based in Iran
Government agencies established in 1982
1982 establishments in Iran
Revolutionary institutions of the Islamic Republic of Iran
Iranian entities subject to the U.S. Department of the Treasury sanctions